P2X purinoceptor 7 is a protein that in humans is encoded by the P2RX7 gene.

The product of this gene belongs to the family of purinoceptors for ATP. Multiple alternatively spliced variants which would encode different isoforms have been identified although some fit nonsense-mediated decay criteria.

The receptor is found in the central and peripheral nervous systems, in microglia, in macrophages, in uterine endometrium, and in the retina. The P2X7 receptor also serves as a pattern recognition receptor for extracellular ATP-mediated apoptotic cell death, regulation of receptor trafficking, mast cell degranulation, and inflammation.

Structure and kinetics 

The P2X7 subunits can form homomeric receptors only with a typical P2X receptor structure.
The P2X7 receptor is a ligand-gated cation channel that opens in response to ATP binding and leads to cell depolarization. The P2X7 receptor requires higher levels of ATP than other P2X receptors; however, the response can be potentiated by reducing the concentration of divalent cations such as calcium or magnesium. Continued binding leads to increased permeability to N-methyl-D-glucamine (NMDG+).  P2X7 receptors do not become desensitized readily and continued signaling leads to the aforementioned increased permeability and an increase in current amplitude.

Pharmacology

Agonists 

P2X7 receptors respond to BzATP more readily than ATP. ADP and AMP are weak agonists of P2X7 receptors, but a brief exposure to ATP can increase their effectiveness. Glutathione has been proposed to act as a P2X7 receptor agonist when present at milimolar levels, inducing calcium transients and GABA release from retinal cells.

Antagonists 

The P2X7 receptor current can be blocked by zinc, calcium, magnesium, and copper. P2X7 receptors are sensitive to pyridoxalphosphate-6-azophenyl-2',4'-disulphonic acid (PPADS) and relatively insensitive to suramin, but the suramin analog, NF279, is much more effective. Oxidized ATP (OxATP) and Brilliant Blue G has also been used for blocking P2X7 in inflammation. Other blockers include the large organic cations calmidazolium (a calmodulin antagonist) and KN-62 (a CaM kinase II antagonist).

Receptor trafficking 

In microglia, P2X7 receptors are found mostly on the cell surface. Conserved cysteine residues located in the carboxyl terminus seem to be important for receptor trafficking to the cell membrane.  These receptors are upregulated in response to peripheral nerve injury.

In melanocytic cells P2X7 gene expression may be regulated by MITF.

Recruitment of pannexin 

Activation of the P2X7 receptor by ATP leads to recruitment of pannexin pores which allow small molecules such as ATP to leak out of cells. This allows further activation of purinergic receptors and physiological responses such a spreading cytoplasmic waves of calcium. Moreover, this could be responsible for ATP-dependent lysis of macrophages through the formation of membrane pores permeable to larger molecules.

Clinical significance

Inflammation 

On T cells activation of P2X7 receptors can activate the T cells or cause T cell differentiation, can affect T cell migration or (at high extracellular levels of ATP and/or NAD+) can induce cell death. The CD38 enzyme on B lymphocytes and macrophages reduces extracellular NAD+, promoting the survival of T cells.

Neuropathic pain 

Microglial P2X7 receptors are thought to be involved in neuropathic pain because blockade or deletion of P2X7 receptors results in decreased responses to pain, as demonstrated in vivo. Moreover, P2X7 receptor signaling increases the release of proinflammatory molecules such as IL-1β, IL-6, and TNF-α. In addition, P2X7 receptors have been linked to increases in proinflammatory cytokines such as CXCL2 and CCL3. P2X7 receptors are also linked to P2X4 receptors, which are also associated with neuropathic pain mediated by microglia.

Osteoporosis 

Mutations in this gene have been associated to low lumbar spine bone mineral density and accelerated bone loss in post-menopausal women.

Diabetes 

The ATP/P2X7R pathway may trigger T-cell attacks on the pancreas, rendering it unable to produce insulin. This autoimmune response may be an early mechanism by which the onset of diabetes is caused.

Research

Possible link to hepatic fibrosis 

One study in mice showed that blockade of P2X7 receptors attenuates onset of liver fibrosis.

See also 
 Purinergic receptor
 P2X receptor

References

Further reading

External links 
 

Ion channels